Moussa Mara (born 2 March 1975 in Bamako) is a Malian politician who was Prime Minister of Mali from 2014 to 2015. Previously he served in the government as Minister of Town Planning, and he was an unsuccessful candidate in the 2013 presidential election.

Mara was appointed as Prime Minister on 5 April 2014, following the unexplained resignation of his predecessor Oumar Tatam Ly. After less than a year in office, he resigned on 8 January 2015, and Modibo Keita was appointed to replace him on the same day.

References 

1975 births
Living people
Malian Muslims
Prime Ministers of Mali
People from Bamako
Government ministers of Mali
21st-century Malian people